Coleophora luteocostella is a moth of the family Coleophoridae. It is found in the United States, including Colorado.

References

luteocostella
Moths described in 1875
Moths of North America